The 1963 East Carolina Pirates football team was an American football team that represented East Carolina College (now known as East Carolina University) as an independent during the 1963 NCAA College Division football season. In their second season under head coach Clarence Stasavich, the team compiled a 9–1 record.

Schedule

References

East Carolina
East Carolina Pirates football seasons
East Carolina Football